Het Huis Anubis en de Vijf van Het Magische zwaard (meaning The House of Anubis and the Five of the Magical Sword) is a Dutch / Flemish mystery series in which five people, each born with an oversensitive sense, have to fight against Dark Druids who want to steal their senses for their own purposes. The House of Anubis and the Five of the Magical Sword has aired since 17 March 2010 and was broadcast on Nickelodeon. The last episode aired in 2011. There will not be a third season. The program is produced in association with Studio 100.

The series is a sequel / spin-off to Het Huis Anubis, which ended a year earlier. No traces of the last residents and the cast of the original series are in the new series, although this new cast did make a cameo appearance in the last Anubis film. The movie, called: De terugkeer van Sibuna (meaning The Return of Sibuna), is about Nienke (Nina) and the rest of the club (Fabian, Jeroen (Jerome) and Amber) trying to save Appie (Alfie) from a German clan, who want to curse him to make themselves the rulers of the world.

The only character to appear in both the original and this spin-off is Victor. He appears in the teaser for first episode, where he's seen selling the House to Kai and Arlène.

Plot

Season 1 
Five teenagers are invited to the House of Anubis. Each one of them has their own hypersensitive sense that they have to suppress to be able to live like normal teenagers. According to Merlin's prophecy, they have to develop their senses and work together to unravel the mystery of the Dark Druids, and ultimately, defeat them to protect the Magical Sword - which is, indeed, the legendary Excalibur.

Sterre, Anastacia, Pim, Raphael and Marcel live together under the leadership of the mysterious landlords Arléne and Kai. The teens do not know about the existence of Kai because he hides himself, and spies on the teens by use of cameras. Arléne knows this and is very nice to the kids so they feel at home. The truth, however, is that Kai and Arléne are Dark Druids who want to use the senses the children have to revive Ewan, Kai's brother. One of the girls, Sterre, also starts hearing voices and seeing a girl. But what does this girl want? Will she warn Sterre for Arléne and Kai?

Season 2 
With the Dark Druids gone, the Five should be safe. But nothing is as it seems...
There is another danger the Five doesn't know about: the evil enchantress Morgana le Fay wants to get her hands on the sword of King Arthur. Merlin warns the Five: their senses must come back and they have to learn to control their powers, because only the Five, all together, can defeat Morgana. But Morgana has a helper, Thomas, who moved into the house with his mother. Morgana orders him to separate the Five so that they will never unite to fight against Morgana. Morgana says that he must prevent that the Five get their sense back.

And Morgana's plans works. Anastacia falls in love with Thomas and Thomas knows a way to get them all angry at each other. He has a bracelet that gives him the power to shapeshift. He turns himself into Raphael and tells Sterre that he doesn't like her anymore. But when Sterre tells the real Raphael, he thinks she made it up to be with Pim. Pim is in love with Sterre, but also meets Cato, the new principal's daughter, who falls in love with him. Sterre likes Pim now, but Thomas shapeshifts into Pim, telling her that he likes Cato. Sterre gets angry at the real Pim, but he doesn't remember anything. In the meantime Anastacia is trying to become lead singer in the school band, but she can't sing. She also has concurration; Hester, the sister of Cato. Will it all work out?

Characters

Main protagonists (Residents)

Sterre De Wit
 Played by: Jennifer Welts | 2010–2011 | Episode 1-175
Sterre is a real shy girl who comes from an intellectual family. Her parents never taught her how to express her feelings.
Sterre's sense is touch. If she touches something or someone she can see if it's good or bad. If something is good she feels warmth, but if something is bad she feels cold and ice will appear, first on her hands, later over her whole body. She has to wear gloves to neutralise it.
Sterre talks with her cat doll named: 'Muis', meaning Mouse, she tells Muis everything.
Sterre likes Raphael but because she doesn't know how to express her feelings, she never told him. Raphael also likes her, but Sterre thinks he likes Anastacia. And Raphael thinks Sterre likes Pim.
In the fourth episode of Season 1 she saw a sort of ghost who said she needed her help. Slowly Sterre found out the girl's name was Emily.
Sterre is the only one who found out how to control her sense. Later in the series, Sterre works together with Pim to find out what's going on and why. At the end of Season 2 in episode 115 she gets persuaded by Arlène to go through the portal, where her sense will be taken away, but by thinking about something good the annexation fails and she saves Emily's life.

Anastacia van Emeryck-Reehorst
 Played by: Sanne-Samina Hanssen| 2010–2011 | Episode 1-175
Anastacia comes from a noble family. She's very rich and is used to having her own butlers. Anastacia wants to become a star. Even if she has to blackmail people.
Her sense is sight so she always has to wear sunglasses and uses eyedrops every day. If she doesn't wear her sunglasses she sees flashes and that causes headaches. She also likes Raphael and she thinks he also likes her. But Raphael is in love with Sterre. She sees Raphael and herself as a dream couple. At the end of episode 50 her sense is stolen by the Dark Druids and now she can see without sunglasses. She really likes that, because now she looks "perfect".

Raphael Salomons 
 Played by: Roel Dirven| 2010–2011 | Episode 1-175
Raphael had a special childhood. His father was a trumpeter and always on tour. Because Raphael's mother died when he was young he always had to go on tours with his father. His father was alcoholic and wants him to become as good as himself with playing the piano. He puts too much pressure on Raphael. Raphael has really good ears so his sense is hearing, but that's also his biggest enemy. Raphael always wears headphones and if he doesn't wear them he can hear everything really loud, which mostly just overloads his mind. Raphael likes Sterre but he's too shy to express his feelings about her. He also got blackmailed by Anastacia to audition for the musical and write a song for her. His annexation was in episode 81 in which he lost his oversensitive hearing. He can now hear normally without headphones so when he is wearing them, he can barely hear anything. At first he is afraid to take them off. Sterre talks to him about his headphones, and he eventually takes them off so that he can play piano again.

Marcel Keizer
 Played by: Juliann Ubbergen| 2010–2011 | Episode 1-175
Marcel lived together with his parents and his half-brother in a hotel. They're not very rich and don't spend too much money. But food was not much of a problem for them.
Marcel's sense is taste. If he eats something he sees flashes from what happened to the food. If he eats for example a chicken he sees how old the chicken was, how it was killed and perhaps if it was eaten before. Marcel is scared of this and uses Sambal to neutralise the taste of the food. 
Marcel also has a vivid imagination. He thinks for example that the toads in the headmaster's office are children that the Druids have cursed because of their bad behavior. He also thinks he is a superhero and that Sterre is a witch.
He likes on Anastacia and also thinks she likes him. But Anastacia actually hates him. He realizes that when Lexie walked away and Anastacia is always angry at him. In episode 99 he loses his sense. Giving Ewan the ability to talk.

Pim Versteeg
 Played by: Alex Molenaar| 2010–2011 | Episode 1-175
Pim comes from a poor family. They lived in a house close to a dumpster. He is a great detective and uses garbage for his research. He uses cola bottles as binoculars, and teacups on planks as a scale.
He loves to investigate things and always has a memorecorder with him.
Pim has a very good nose, but that's also something he hates. Pim always has to spray deodorant to not get affected by his sense, smell. He also has an alarm on his watch as a reminder to spray. But if he doesn't put on his deodorant fast enough, or can't use it, he faints.
He was the first one to find out that people wanted to steal their senses. Around episode 30, he works together with Sterre to investigate it. In episode 113, his sense is taken away by the Dark Druids. He helps Sterre at the end of Season 2 (episode 115) to defeat the Dark Druids.

Other protagonists

Kai 
 Played by: Mattijn Hartemink| 2009–2010 | Episode 1-113
Kai is the new owner of the House. He bought the house from Victor. Victor was the owner from the House Anubis in the original series.
Kai lost his brother and wants to get him back to steal the sensitive senses of the children. He hides in the loft, and calculates who is the one who will lose their power. He falls on ground at the failed annexation of Sterre and is now away.

Arlène
 Played by: Marieke De Kruijf| 2010 | Episode 1-113
She is housewife in the House of Anubis. She took after Trudy. She's very sweet to the children and fulfills their wishes. But she's actually a Druid who wants to steal the Senses of the children. Arlène is married to Ewan and therefore wants him back. She is always bossed around by Kai and is sort of afraid of him. Then again, she is always bossing Hubertus around.

Leopold 
 Played by: Bennie de Haan| 2010 | Episode 4-77, 115
Leopold is the new history teacher. He's the father of Emily and wants to do everything to save her. He has some kind of diary in which he writes about the Five. During the series he teaches in class about the Dark Druids. He also tells Pim and Sterre about the Dark Druids and the Five. He convinces them to help him and tells them they are the Five. In episode 40 he told the legend about the five. But he gets in trouble with the Dark Druids and is also detained. In episode 77 he is taken through the portal and at the end of episode 115 he is in the annexation of Sterre. He eventually gets saved, just like Emily.

Emily 
 Played by: Minke Gommer| 2010| Episode 3-115
Emily is a girl who gets captured by the Dark Druids because she has "the sixth sense". She can keep Ewan alive as long as she stay in the Magical World, because she held captive in the Stone Circle. She can only be seen by Sterre and calls Sterre for help. She's the daughter of Leopold, the history teacher.

Bertina Van Meent (Lexie) 
 Played by: Maaike Bakker| 2010 | Episode 21-96, 115
Lexie is a classmate of the Five. Lexie likes to talk and is very noisy. When she met the Five she wanted to know more about them. Why Sterre always wears gloves, why Raphael always wears headphones, why Anastacia always wears sunglasses, why Pim sprays deodorant all the time, what happens to him when his alarm goes off, and why Marcel puts Sambal on everything.
But the children don't want to tell her anything. Lexie also has a big secret. She ran away from home, because she thought she set a shopping mall on fire. Her real name is Bertina Van Meent. Anastacia finds out, but promises she won't tell anyone about her secret if Lexie sings for her voice in the musical. Lexie doesn't want to help so Anastacia blackmails her. Lexie has likes Marcel, but she gets tired of Marcel only talking about Anastacia. She walked away in episode 96 because Marcel doesn't talk to her anymore. In episode 115 she came back to sing for Anastacia. But Anastacia doesn't playback and lets Lexie sing on stage.

Hubertus Berkelaar 
 Played by: Arthur Veen| 2010 | Episode 5-115
Hubertus is the headmaster of the school the children go to. He has a big passion for toads and always keeps them in his office.
He's also a Dark Druid who works for with Kai and Arlène to steal the senses of the Five.

Wietteke 
 Played by: Mirjam Hegger| 2010 | Episode 6-115
Wietteke is the librarian of the school. She's a spy for the Dark Druids and keeps an eye on the Five. She is kind of like a slave of Hubertus.

Camillia 
 Played by: Liëla Rigter| 2010–2011 | Episode 10 to season 2
Camillia is the musical teacher. She wants to produce a school musical. She thinks that Raphael should join, because he's great at playing piano. Together with the beautiful singing voice of Anastacia he should work together on the musical. She doesn't know that it isn't Anastacia's real voice.
In the beginning of the musical auditions she finds out Raphael wanted to audition for the musical. But he can't because his father thinks musicals are bad for his hearing. Eventually he joined with the pseudonym Paolo. She got replaced in Season 2.

Jeweller
 Played by: Marianne Vloetgraven| 2010 | Episode 7-115
She is the owner of a Jewelry shop. She has some items the children sometimes use. Like a book about Witchcraft or a de-toad ointment.
But she also is one of the Dark Druid's who wants to steal the Senses of the Five.

Ewan
 Played by: Mattijn Hartemink (voice)| 2010 | Episode 1-115
Ewan is the dead brother of Kai. His spirit is kept in a diamond dome and he receives the senses from the Five when they are stolen.

Morgana Le Fay
 Played by: Peggy Vrijens| 2011 | Episode 116-175

Morgana Le Fay is the most powerful rival of Merlin, who wants the magical sword Excalibur. With this, she can rule the world, but if she ever gets the sword, all love, friendship, peace etc. will disappear from the world! She sends Thomas to the house to break up the Five. She can teleport, change into a statue, communicate with her helpers via water, appear scenes on mirrors, make an EXACT fake copy of anything, shapeshift, and most importantly, change people into animals with one single touch (ones without the sign of the five or the amulet)! It's also that she controls the nature because she can detain people by tree bushes, shoot lightning at people she hates incredibly badly, close and lock doors without touching, turn off lights. At episode 164 she was furious that the five had EXCALIBUR and asked Thomas to bring her in the real world. When she was in the real world, it was clear that she cannot cope against sunlight. Sterre can freeze her but much more importantly, she's afraid of fire.

Thomas 
 Played by: Emiel Sandke| 2011 | Episode 116-175

Thomas is sent by Morgana Le Fay to break up the Five. Anastacia falls in love with him and he starts to like her to. But he is reminded to stay focused by Morgana.

Tineke
 Played by: Marit van Bohemen| 2011 | Episode 117-175

Tineke is the mother of Thomas. She gets a job offer to take care of 5 children in a house. She and Thomas move to The House of Anubis, so Thomas is able to break up the Five. She doesn't know about what Thomas is doing.

External links 
  (Dutch)

References

Dutch drama television series
2010s Dutch television series
2010 Dutch television series debuts
2011 Dutch television series endings
Dutch-language television shows